Jean-Pierre Bohard (born February 2, 1969) was a French nordic combined skier who competed from 1987 to 1989. He finished eighth in the 3 x 10 km team event at the 1988 Winter Olympics in Calgary.

Bohard's best World Cup finish was 14th in a 15 km individual event in France in 1987.

External links
 

Nordic combined skiers at the 1988 Winter Olympics
French male Nordic combined skiers
Olympic Nordic combined skiers of France
1969 births
Living people